Modugno Città is a railway station in Modugno, Italy. The station is located on the Bari–Taranto railway and Bari–Matera railway. The train services are operated by Trenitalia and Ferrovie Appulo Lucane.

Train services
The station is served by the following service(s):

Local services (Treno regionale) Bari - Gioia del Colle - Taranto
Local services (Treno regionale) Bari - Altamura - Gravina - Potenza
Local services (Treno regionale) Bari - Altamura - Matera

References

This article is based upon a translation of the Italian language version as at September 2014.

Railway stations in Apulia
Buildings and structures in the Province of Bari